Satsang Deoghar disaster is a human stampede that occurred on 24 September 2012, in which twelve people died and thirty people were injured at the Satsang Ashram in Deoghar, Jharkhand.

The tragedy occurred when over two lakh (200,000) devotees assembled in the satsang complex in the prayer hall at the samadhi of Sree Sree Thakur Anukulchandra to celebrate the 125th birthday of the revered sreeguru.

References

2012 disasters in India
Human stampedes in India
Human stampedes in 2012
2010s in Jharkhand
Deoghar
Disasters in Jharkhand